Major General Walter Burl Huffman, USA (born October 8, 1944) was an American military lawyer who served as the Judge Advocate General of the United States Army from August 5, 1997 until September 30, 2001.  He has been a professor at the Texas Tech University School of Law since 2002 and was the dean from 2002 to 2009.

Awards and decorations

Footnotes

Bibliography

References

Further reading

1944 births
People from Biloxi, Mississippi
Texas Tech University alumni
Texas Tech University School of Law alumni
Texas Tech University faculty
Living people
Judge Advocates General of the United States Army
United States Army generals
Recipients of the Legion of Merit
Recipients of the Defense Superior Service Medal